Foldereid is a former municipality in the northern part of the old Nord-Trøndelag county in Norway. The  municipality existed from 1886 until its dissolution in 1964. The municipality encompassed the area surrounding the inner part of the Folda fjord, the Innerfolda in what is now the municipalities of Nærøysund and Høylandet in Trøndelag county. The village of Foldereid, where the Foldereid Church is located, was the administrative centre of the municipality.

History

The municipality of Foldereid was established on 1 October 1886 when it was separated from the large municipality of Kolvereid. Initially, the new municipality had 948 residents. During the 1960s, there were many municipal mergers across Norway due to the work of the Schei Committee. On 1 January 1964, the municipality of Foldereid was dissolved. The eastern Kongsmoen area (population: 221) was merged into the neighboring municipality of Høylandet and the remainder of the municipality (population: 817) was merged into the neighboring municipality of Nærøy.

Name
The municipality (originally the parish) is named after the old Foldereid farm. The farm is named after the local fjord, Foldafjorden. The first element is the genitive case of the name of the local fjord, which has an uncertain meaning.

Government
While it existed, this municipality was responsible for primary education (through 10th grade), outpatient health services, senior citizen services, unemployment, social services, zoning, economic development, and municipal roads. During its existence, this municipality was governed by a municipal council of elected representatives, which in turn elected a mayor.

Municipal council
The municipal council  of Foldereid was made up of 13 representatives that were elected to four year terms.  The party breakdown of the final municipal council was as follows:

Mayors
The mayors of Foldereid:

 1887-1889: Haagen E. Andersen 	
 1890-1891: Ole Tobias Olsen 	
 1892-1895: Martin Rosendal 
 1896-1903: Johannes Klingen 	
 1904-1904: Even M. Aune 
 1905-1907: Martin Rosendal 	
 1908-1919: Andreas Synnes 	
 1920-1922: Jermund E. Homo (Bp)
 1923–1928: Richard Sivertsen (Bp)
 1929–1931: Jermund E. Homo (Bp)
 1932–1934: Peter Jæger-Leirvik (Bp)
 1935–1937: Bjarne Krekling (Bp)
 1938–1940: Stockfleth Saur (Bp)
 1940–1942: Ingvald Rishaug 
 1942–1945: Peter Jæger-Leirvik (NS)
 1945-1947: Stockfleth Saur (Bp)
 1948–1951: Bjarne Krekling (Bp)
 1952–1955: Karl Vennevik (Bp)
 1956–1959: Gunnar Brevik (Bp)
 1960–1963: Sveinung Leirvik (Bp)

See also
List of former municipalities of Norway

References

Høylandet
Nærøysund
Nærøy
Former municipalities of Norway
1886 establishments in Norway
1964 disestablishments in Norway